Nancy Smyth, is a Canadian career foreign affairs professional and Ambassador to Ireland. Her term started in June 2021 when she presented her credentials to the President of Ireland at Áras an Uachtaráin. She has undertaken several official engagements including attending a memorial of the victims of the 1985 Air India bombing, commemorating the 1917 sinking of the SS Laurentic and advocating for increased trade between Ireland and Canada.

References

External links 

Ambassadors of Canada to Ireland
Year of birth missing (living people)
Living people